Phil Hill (born 23 May 1982) is a Welsh professional ice hockey player currently playing for the Cardiff Devils of the Elite Ice Hockey League. He is also a member of the Great Britain national ice hockey team.

References

1982 births
Living people
Sportspeople from Cardiff
Cardiff Devils players
Nottingham Lions players
Sheffield Steelers players
Welsh ice hockey forwards